This is a list of Scotland Twenty20 International cricket records, that is record team and individual performances in Twenty20 International cricket.  It is based on the List of Twenty20 International records.

Scotland played its first international Twenty20 game against Ireland in August 2008 and registered first T20i win against Bermuda on the very next day.

Listing criteria 

In general the top five are listed in each category (except when there is a tie for the last place among the five, when all the tied record holders are noted). Currently active players are listed in bold.

Team records

Overall results

Matches played (total)

Matches played (by country)

Team scoring records

Highest innings totals

Highest match aggregate

Largest successful run chases

Lowest innings totals

Lowest match aggregate

Largest margin of victory (by wickets)

Largest margin of victory (by runs)

Largest margin of victory (by balls remaining)

Smallest margin of victory (by runs)

Smallest margin of victory (by wickets)

Smallest margin of victory (by balls remaining)

Tied matches

Individual records

Individual records (batting)

Highest individual score

Most career runs

Highest career average

Highest career strike rate

Most career sixes

Most career fours

Individual records (bowling)

Best figures in a match

Most career wickets

Best career economy rate

Best career strike rate

Best career average

Individual records (wicketkeeping )

Most dismissals in career

Individual records (fielding)

Most catches (non-wicketkeeper)

Individual records (other)

Most matches played in career

Partnership records

Record wicket partnerships 

*Note: An asterisk (*) signifies an unbroken partnership (i.e. neither of the batsmen were dismissed before either the end of the allotted overs or they reached the required score).

Highest partnerships 

*Note: An asterisk (*) signifies an unbroken partnership (i.e. neither of the batsmen were dismissed before either the end of the allotted overs or they reached the required score).

See also
 List of Twenty20 International records

References 

Scotland
Irish cricket lists